Bagroides is a genus of bagrid catfishes found in eastern Asia.

Species
 Bagroides hirsutus (Herre, 1934)
 Bagroides melapterus Bleeker, 1851

References
 

Bagridae
Fish of Asia
Taxa named by Pieter Bleeker
Catfish genera
Freshwater fish genera